Harrison Tasher (born 5 January 1985) is a Belizean professional footballer who currently plays for Belize Defence Force and the Belize national football team as a midfielder.

External links
 Career summary at FIFA.com

1985 births
Belize international footballers
Belizean footballers
Premier League of Belize players
Living people
2013 CONCACAF Gold Cup players
Association football midfielders
FC Belize players
Wagiya FC players
Belize Defence Force FC players